The  first season of La Voz premiered on January 13, 2019 on Telemundo. The coaches for this season were Luis Fonsi, Carlos Vives, Alejandra Guzmán and Wisin. The season was hosted by Jorge Bernal, Jacqueline Bracamontes and Jéssica Cediel backstage.

On Sunday, April 21, 2019, Jeidimar Rijos was announced the first season winner of La Voz US, alongside her coach, Luis Fonsi. She won the prize of $100,000 USD and a contract with Universal Music Group.

Coaches 

On May 10, 2018, along with the announcement of the show, it was confirmed that Luis Fonsi would be a coach on La Voz. On July 5, 2018, Telemundo announced that Alejandra Guzmán has also joined the show as a coach, followed by Wisin on July 12. On September 13, 2018, it was confirmed that Carlos Vives would be joining the show as the fourth and final coach.

Jorge Bernal, former host of Telemundo's La Voz Kids, and Jéssica Cediel were paired as hosts for the first season. Jacqueline Bracamontes, former host of La Voz ... México, joined them at the Battles.

This is the first season in The Voice franchise that all four coaches have served the same role in other countries before joining the panel, with Wisin and Guzmán both having coached participants in the third season of La Voz... México, Vives was on the Mexican and the Colombian version, and Fonsi was on the Chilean version and the Spanish version of the show.

Some of the advisors for the Battle round are: Prince Royce for Team Wisin, Becky G for Team Guzmán, Christian Nodal for Team Fonsi, and Carlos Rivera for Team Vives.

Teams 
 Color key

Blind Auditions 
In the Blind Auditions, the four coaches had to form their own teams, each of which would consist of 12 contestants. Each coach had one Block to prevent one of the other coaches from getting a contestant.

NOTE:  In order to be consistent with the summaries provided by the franchise, the "Quiro Tu Voz" button is referred by its global name, "I Want You".

Color key

Episode 1 (January 13)

Episode 2 (January 20)

Episode 3 (January 27)

Episode 4 (February 3)

Episode 5 (February 10)

Episode 6 (February 17)

The Battles 
The Battle Rounds started on February 24. Season one advisors included: Prince Royce for Team Wisin, Becky G for Team Guzmán, Christian Nodal for Team Fonsi, and Carlos Rivera for Team Vives. The coaches could steal two losing artists from other coaches. Contestants who won their battle or were stolen by another coach advanced to the Live Shows.

Color key:

Live Shows 
The Live Shows started on March 31. They featured two nights of Live Playoffs, the Semifinal and Finale. The airing schedule was changed to 8:30pm/7:30c only for this phase of the show, and only in this season.

Color key:

Week 1 & 2:  Live Playoffs (March 31 & April 7) 
The Live Playoffs comprised episodes 12 and 13. The top thirty-two artists performed. Two artists from each team advanced to the next stage based on the viewers' vote, and each coach made their own choice for completing their respective teams. The first night (Sunday, March 31) featured two teams' performances, whereas the second night (Sunday, April 7) featured the other two teams, along with the results of the first two teams.

Week 3: Semifinal (April 14) 
Team Wisin and Team Vives' results of last week were announced during the night.

Week 4: Finale (April 21) 
The final night featured duet and group performances from the semi-finalists as well as performances from guest performers. After all artists performed, host Jacqueline Bracamontes announced the four artists who received the most votes from the public in no particular order. The final results were announced shortly after, without any competition performances from the top 4 involved.

Final result

Elimination Chart

Overall 
Color key
Artist's info

Result details

Teams 
Color key
Artist's info

Results details

Artists' appearance on other shows 
 Mayré Martínez was the winner of the first season of Latin American Idol.
 Manny Cabo and Ivonne Acero both took part in on the ninth season of the English U.S. version but were eliminated during the Battle round and Live Playoffs respectively.
 Genesis Diaz and Johnny Bliss both competed in the fourteenth season of the English American U.S. version but were eliminated during the Battle round and Live Playoffs respectively.
 Lluvia Vega competed in La Reina De La Cancion & on the first season of La Voz... México and finished at the top 8.
 Brisila Barros was on the first season of El Factor X United States.
 Jeidimar Rijos competed in the first season of La Voz Kids but was eliminated in the Semifinals. She also competed in the second season of La Banda and reached Top 24.
 Kemily Corrales competed in the first season of La Voz Kids but was eliminated in the Live shows.
 Yailenys Pérez was on the second season of La Voz Kids but was eliminated in the Battle rounds.
 Katherine Lopez and Sheniel Maisonet passed the audition on the second season of La Banda  but failed to continue towards the second phase of the competition.
 Yashira Rodríguez and Veronica Rodriguez both were on the second season of La Banda but were eliminated at the Top 36 and Quarterfinals respectively.
Mari Burelle, competing as MARi, represents the state of New Hampshire in the first season of American Song Contest with her song "Fly".

Ratings

References 

2019 American television seasons
United States